Recipe for Murder is a 52-minute Australian TV docudrama film released in May 2011. It recounts some of the history of a series of murders in post-World War II Sydney by women using thallium sulphate poisons. It was written and directed by Sonia Bible, produced by Susan Lambert and narrated by Dan Wyllie.

Subjects
The crimes of three murderesses, Yvonne Fletcher, Caroline Grills and Veronica Monty are examined in the context of a wave of dozens of thallium poisonings that took place in Sydney in the period 1947–1953. The events are related to post-war poverty and social stresses, and to the ready availability of thallium sulphate rat poisons which could be easily administered to humans in food and drink, being virtually tasteless and odourless. The three were convicted and imprisoned, but the documentary suggests that many more murders by other persons could have remained undetected. As a result of these events, the Australian states began to ban unrestricted availability of thallium in 1952.

Cast
Anne Looby – Yvonne Fletcher
Betty Tougher – Caroline Grills
Aimee Horne – Veronica Monty
James Anderson – Bobby Lulham 
Matthew Dale – Detective Don Ferguson
Grant Garland – Detective Sergeant Fred Krahe

Reception
The film won a Silver Hugo at the Chicago International Film Festival and screened to a large audience on the ABC in 2011. Writer/director Sonia Bible was also awarded a NSW Premier's History Award for 2011.

References

External links

Recipe for Murder at ABC Television, April 2012. Retrieved 29 April 2012.
Recipe for Murder at ABC Life Matters, 26 May 2011. Retrieved 29 April 2012.
Recipe for murder: The poisoners' tales at SMH, 22 May 2011. Retrieved 29 April 2012.
Watts, Richard Recipe for Murder Review at artsHub, 24 May 2011. Retrieved 29 April 2012.

2011 television films
2011 films
Documentary films about crime
Films set in New South Wales
Australian documentary television films
Crime in Sydney
2011 documentary films